Justice Byrd may refer to:

Conley Byrd, associate justice of the Arkansas Supreme Court
William M. Byrd, associate justice of the Alabama Supreme Court

See also
Justice Bird (disambiguation)